The 1972 Illinois Fighting Illini football team was an American football team that represented the University of Illinois during the 1972 Big Ten Conference football season. In their second year under head coach Bob Blackman, the Illini compiled a 3–8 record and finished in a tie for sixth place in the Big Ten Conference.

The team's offensive leaders were quarterback Mike Wells with 837 passing yards, running back George Uremovich with 611 rushing yards, and wide receiver Garvin Roberson with 569 receiving yards. Center Larry McCarren and defensive end Larry Allen were selected as the team's most valuable players.

Schedule

Roster

References

Illinois
Illinois Fighting Illini football seasons
Illinois Fighting Illini football